Mission in Kabul is a 1970 Soviet drama film directed by Leonid Kvinikhidze.

Plot 
The film takes place in Afghanistan in 1919. The film tells about the struggle of the mission in Kabul with representatives of the West for signing a cooperation agreement.

Cast 
 Oleg Zhakov as Pyotr Petrovich Sorokin
 Irina Miroshnichenko as Marina Arkadyevna Luzhina
 Gleb Strizhenov as Gedeonov
 Emmanuil Vitorgan as Kalnin
 Oleg Vidov as Skazkin (voiced by Alexander Demyanenko)
 Mikhail Gluzsky as Garri
 Aleksandr Demyanenko as Smykov
 Vladimir Zamansky as Aleksey Repin
 Vladimir Zeldin as Major Stein
 Vladimir Etush as Abdulla-Khan
 Otar Koberidze as Mohammed Nadir Shah
 Algimantas Masiulis as Gerhard Epp
 Gennadi Nilov as Soviet diplomat Ivan Kolokoltsev

References

External links 
 

1970 films
1970s Russian-language films
Soviet drama films
1970 drama films
Lenfilm films
Films set in Afghanistan